The following are the 27 municipalities of the canton of Neuchâtel, as of 2021.

List 

Boudry
Brot-Plamboz
Cornaux
Cortaillod
Cressier (NE)
Enges
Hauterive (NE)
La Brévine
La Chaux-de-Fonds
La Chaux-du-Milieu
La Côte-aux-Fées
La Grande-Béroche
La Sagne
La Tène
Le Cerneux-Péquignot
Le Landeron
Le Locle
Les Planchettes
Les Ponts-de-Martel
Les Verrières
Lignières
Milvignes
Neuchâtel
Rochefort
Saint-Blaise
Val-de-Ruz
Val-de-Travers

References

 
Subdivisions of the canton of Neuchâtel
Neuchatel